The Miss Hong Kong Pageant 2020  was the 48th Miss Hong Kong Pageant that was held in TVB City on 30 August 2020. There was a socially distanced and masked audience due to the ongoing COVID-19 pandemic.

Miss Hong Kong 2019 winner Carmaney Wong crowned her successor Lisa-Marie Tse at the end of the pageant. The theme of the pageant was gardens, forestry, and nature.

Results

Placements

Special Awards
These awards were given during the telecast of the pageant on August 30:
Miss Photogenic:8.Lisa-Marie Tse (謝嘉怡)
Miss Friendship:5.Maisie Kwong (鄺美璇）'''

Delegates 

The Miss Hong Kong 2020 delegates are:

Top 12 Finalist:

Top 15 Finalist:

Top 18 Finalist:

Elimination chart

References

External links 
 Official Website

Miss Hong Kong Pageants
2020 in Hong Kong
Hong Kong